Annette Duetz (born 29 June 1993 in Zeddam) is a sailor from the Netherlands.  Together with Annemiek Bekkering, she is the bronze medalist of the 2020 Summer Olympics in Skiff – 49er FX.

Bekkering and Duetz qualified for the 2016 Summer Olympics in Skiff – 49er FX. They earlier lost the national selection to Nina Keizer en Claire Blom, but Keizer and Blom failed to fulfill the qualification criteria of NOC/NSF. At the Olympics, Bekkering and Duetz finished in the seventh position.

Since 2011, Duetz studied Applied Physics at Delft University of Technology.

References

External links
 
 
 

1993 births
Living people
Dutch female sailors (sport)
People from Montferland
Sportspeople from Gelderland
Olympic sailors of the Netherlands
Sailors at the 2016 Summer Olympics – 49er FX
Sailors at the 2020 Summer Olympics – 49er FX
Medalists at the 2020 Summer Olympics
Olympic medalists in sailing
Olympic bronze medalists for the Netherlands
49er FX class sailors
World champions in sailing for the Netherlands
49er FX class world champions
21st-century Dutch women